Jaggy may refer to:

Jaggies, in computer graphics, the stairlike lines that appear where there should be smooth straight lines or curves
There's No Such Thing as a Jaggy Snake, a song by Biffy Clyro
Jaggy Shivdasani (born 1958), Indian bridge player

Football
Jaggy MacBee, club mascot of Partick Thistle and Junior side Rossvale.
Phil Jagielka (born 1982), English professional footballer
Kim Jaggy (born 1982), Swiss-born Haitian footballer